Prince Frederick Josias of Saxe-Coburg-Saalfeld (26 December 1737 – 26 February 1815) was an Austrian nobleman and military general.

Biography
Born at Schloß Ehrenburg in Coburg, he was the youngest son of Duke Francis Josias, Duke of Saxe-Coburg-Saalfeld and Princess Anna Sophie of Schwarzburg-Rudolstadt. He was the great-uncle of King Leopold I of Belgium (1790–1865); and the great-great-uncle of Queen Victoria of the United Kingdom (1819–1901).

Military career

Josias joined the Habsburg military as Colonel in 1759, participated in the Seven Years' War, and rose to the rank of lieutenant field marshal by 1773. In the Russo-Turkish-Austrian war of 1788, he commanded an army corps under Freiherr von Laudon, occupying Moldavia, capturing Khotyn in Bessarabia and sharing in Aleksandr Suvorov's victory in the Battle of Focșani (1 August 1789). Having completely beaten the main Ottoman army under Grand Vizier Koca Yusuf Pasha in the Battle of Rymnik, he captured the greater part of Wallachia, including Bucharest, being welcomed by the population after the flight of Prince Nicholas Mavrogenes (see History of Bucharest), and soon after becoming a field marshal.

During the occupation of Moldavia, Josias met Therese Stroffeck, a commoner. On 24 September 1789, in the town of Roman, she  bore him a son, named Frederick. Josias married Therese after their return to Coburg, on 24 December and recognized his son. Frederick was ennobled by the Austrian Emperor on 25 August 1808 and on 17 February 1853 the Duke Ernst II of Saxe-Coburg-Gotha created him Freiherr von Rohmann, named after the place of his birth. Frederick however, as the child of a morganatic marriage, and his descendants were barred of the succession of the duchy of Saxe-Coburg-Saalfeld.

In 1793 and 1794 he commanded the army in the Austrian Netherlands during the Flanders Campaign. Due to his victory in the French Revolutionary Wars at Neerwinden in March 1793, he returned the region to Austrian control. Entering France, he took Condé, Valenciennes, Quesnoy and Landrecies. However, due to unfortunate positioning, partly due to disunity amongst the Allied powers and their forces, he suffered a string of minor setbacks in front of the Revolutionary Army on the Sambre, followed by a decisive defeat at Fleurus (26 June 1794).

He thereupon abandoned the Netherlands, which Habsburg diplomats had already decided to give up. Angered by this, and openly criticizing the policies of the Baron Thugut, Josias resigned as Field Marshal (the Count of Clerfayt assumed command in his place) and retired to Coburg, where he later died.

Ancestry

References

Meyers Konversations-Lexikon of 1888–89. In turn, it cites:
A. von Witzleben, Prinz Friedrich J. von Koburg-Saalfeld, Herzog zu Sachsen, Berlin, 1859

Military leaders of the French Revolutionary Wars
Austrian Empire commanders of the Napoleonic Wars
Austrian Empire military leaders of the French Revolutionary Wars
Field marshals of Austria
History of Bucharest
Princes of Saxe-Coburg Saalfeld
1737 births
1815 deaths
People from Coburg
Generals of the Holy Roman Empire
Grand Crosses of the Military Order of Maria Theresa
Sons of monarchs